Badile Lubamba (born 26 April 1976 in Kinshasa, Zaire) is a Swiss former professional footballer of Congolese descent who played as a defender.

References

External links
 
 

Living people
1976 births
Democratic Republic of the Congo emigrants to Switzerland
Naturalised citizens of Switzerland
Footballers from Kinshasa
Association football defenders
Swiss men's footballers
Swiss Super League players
Ligue 1 players
Ligue 2 players
SR Delémont players
FC Luzern players
FC Lugano players
ES Troyes AC players
FC Sion players
FC Lausanne-Sport players
Neuchâtel Xamax FCS players
AS Vita Club players
Switzerland international footballers
Democratic Republic of the Congo expatriate footballers
Democratic Republic of the Congo expatriate sportspeople in France
Democratic Republic of the Congo footballers
Expatriate footballers in France
Swiss expatriate footballers
Swiss expatriate sportspeople in France
Swiss people of Democratic Republic of the Congo descent